ARC is a lossless data compression and archival format by System Enhancement Associates (SEA). The file format and the program were both called ARC. The format is known as the subject of controversy in the 1980s, part of important debates over what would later be known as open formats.

ARC was extremely popular during the early days of the dial-up BBS. ARC was convenient as it combined the functions of the SQ program to compress files and the LU program to create .LBR archives of multiple files. The format was later replaced by the ZIP format, which offered better compression ratios and the ability to retain directory structures through the compression/decompression process.

The .arc filename extension is often used for several unrelated file archive-like file types. For example, the Internet Archive used its own ARC format to store multiple web resources into a single file. The FreeArc archiver also uses .arc extension, but uses a completely different file format. Nintendo uses an unrelated "ARC" format for resources, such as MIDI, voice samples, or text, in GameCube and Wii games. Several unofficial extractors exist for this type of ARC file.

History 
In 1985, Thom Henderson of System Enhancement Associates wrote a program called ARC, based on earlier programs such as ar, that not only grouped files into a single archive file but also compressed them to save disk space, a feature of great importance on early personal computers, where space was very limited and modem transmission speeds were very slow. The archive files produced by ARC had file names ending in ".ARC" and were thus sometimes called "arc files".

The source code for ARC was released by SEA in 1986 and subsequently ported to Unix and  Atari ST in 1987 by Howard Chu. This more portable codebase was subsequently ported to other platforms, including VAX/VMS and IBM System/370 mainframes. Howard's work was also the first to disprove the prevalent belief that Lempel-Ziv encoded files could not be further compressed. Additional compression could be achieved by using Huffman coding on the LZW data, and Howard's version of ARC was the first program to demonstrate this property. This hybrid technique was later used in several other compression schemes by Phil Katz and others.

Later, Phil Katz developed his own shareware utilities, PKARC and PKXARC, to create archive files and extract their contents. These files worked with the archive file format used by ARC and were significantly faster than ARC on the IBM-PC platform due to selective assembly-language coding. Unlike SEA, which combined archive creation and archive file extraction in a single program, Katz divided these functions between two separate utilities, reducing the amount of memory needed to run them. PKARC also allowed the creation of self-extracting archives, which could unpack themselves without requiring an external file extraction utility.

Following the System Enhancement Associates, Inc. vs PKWARE Inc. and Phillip W. Katz lawsuit, SEA withdrew from the shareware market and developed ARC+Plus. This version included a full-screen user interface, with the last known version being 7.12. SEA was eventually sold to an unspecified Japanese company in 1992.

The ARC format is no longer common on PC desktops, but most antivirus scanners can still uncompress any ARC archives found in order to detect viruses within the compressed files.

Lawsuits 
In the late 1980s a dispute arose between SEA, maker of the ARC program, and PKWARE, Inc. (Phil Katz Software). SEA sued Katz for trademark and copyright infringement. An independent software expert, John Navas, was appointed by the court to compare the two programs, and stated that PKARC was a derivative work of ARC, pointing out that comments in both programs were often identical, including spelling errors.

In the agreement, PKWARE paid SEA to obtain a license that allowed the distribution of PKWARE's ARC-compatible programs until January 31, 1989, after which PKWARE would not license, publish or distribute any ARC compatible programs or utilities that process ARC compatible files. In exchange, PKWARE licensed SEA to use its source code for PKWARE's ARC-compatible programs. PKWARE also agreed to cease any use of SEA's trademark "ARC" and to change the names or marks used with PKWARE's programs to non-confusing designations. The remaining details of the agreement were sealed. In reaching the settlement, the defendants did not admit any fault or wrongdoing. The Wisconsin court order showed defendants were ordered to pay damages to plaintiff for defendants' acts of infringing Plaintiff's copyrights, trademark, and acts of unfair trade practices and unfair competition.

In addition, defendants would pay plaintiff a royalty fee of 6.5% of all revenue received for ARC compatible programs on all orders received after the effective date of this Agreement, such revenue including any license fees or shareware registrations received after the expiration of the license, for ARC compatible programs. In exchange, plaintiff would also pay a commission in the amount of 6.5% of any license fees received by plaintiff from any licensee referred to plaintiff by defendants, whether before or after the license termination date.

After the lawsuit, PKWARE released one last version of his PKARC and PKXARC utilities under the new names "PKPAK" and "PKUNPAK", and from then on concentrated on developing the separate programs PKZIP and PKUNZIP, which were based on new and different file compression techniques and archive file formats. However, following the renaming, SEA filed a lawsuit against PKWARE for contempt, for continually using plaintiff's
protected mark ARC, by turning ARC from noun into verb in the PKPAK manual. The U.S. district court of the East District of Wisconsin ruled SEA's motion was denied, and the defendant was entitled to recover the legal cost of $500.

The SEA vs. PKWARE dispute quickly expanded into one of the largest controversies the BBS world ever saw. The suit by SEA angered many shareware users who perceived that SEA was a "large, faceless corporation" and Katz was "the little guy". In fact, at the time, both SEA and PKWARE were small home-based companies. However, the community largely sided with Katz, due to the fact that SEA was attempting to retroactively declare the ARC file format to be closed and proprietary. Katz received positive publicity by releasing the APPNOTE.TXT specification documenting the ZIP file format, and declaring that the ZIP file format would always be free for competing software to implement. The net result was that the ARC format quickly dropped out of common use as the predominant compression format that PC-BBSs used for their file archives, and after a brief period of competing formats, the ZIP format was adopted as the predominant standard.

In an interview, Thom Henderson of SEA said that the main reason he dropped out of software development was because of his inability to emotionally cope with what he claimed was the hate-mail campaign launched against him by Katz.

See also 
List of archive formats

References

External links 
 ARC file format description
 ARC — free software Linux/Unix port of the .arc compression program
 nomarch — another free software .arc compression program for Linux/Unix
  — A documentary by Jason Scott that discusses ARC history, in the context of BBS, with notes: "CONTROVERSY: LAWSUITS: SEA vs. PKWARE"

Archive formats
1985 software